Chaygaon Assembly constituency is one of the 126 assembly constituencies of Assam Legislative Assembly. Chaygaon forms part of the Gauhati Lok Sabha constituency.

Town Details

Following are details on Chaygaon Assembly constituency-

Country: India.
 State: Assam.
 District: Kamrup district .
 Lok Sabha Constituency: Gauhati Lok Sabha/Parliamentary constituency.
 Assembly Categorisation: Rural constituency.
 Literacy Level:72.81%.
 Eligible Electors as per 2021 General Elections: 1,92,597 Eligible Electors. Male Electors:96,743 . Female Electors: 95,851 .
 Geographic Co-Ordinates: 25°54'04.7"N 91°17'43.1"E.
 Total Area Covered: 694 square kilometres.
 Area Includes: Chaygaon thana (excluding Dakhin Sarubongsor mouza) and Bongaon mouza in Boko thana in Gauhati sub-division, of Kamrup district of Assam.
 Inter State Border :Kamrup.
 Number Of Polling Stations: Year 2011-193,Year 2016-198,Year 2021-49.

Members of Legislative Assembly 

Following is the list of past members representing Chabua Assembly constituency in Assam Legislature.

 1967: H. Goswami, Indian National Congress.
 1972: Satyavati Goswami, Indian National Congress.
 1978: A. N. Akram Hussain, Indian National Congress (Indira).
 1983: Harendra Nath Talukdar, Indian National Congress.
 1985: Dr. Kamala Kanta Kalita, Independent.
 1991: Dr. Kamala Kanta Kalita, Asom Gana Parishad.
 1996: Dr. Kamala Kanta Kalita, Asom Gana Parishad.
 2001: Rana Goswami, Indian National Congress.
 2006: Dr. Kamala Kanta Kalita, Asom Gana Parishad.
 2011: Rekibuddin Ahmed, Indian National Congress.
 2016: Rekibuddin Ahmed, Indian National Congress.
 2021: Rekibuddin Ahmed, Indian National Congress.

Election results

2016 result

References

External links 
 

Assembly constituencies of Assam